Gmina Adamów is a rural gmina (administrative district) in Zamość County, Lublin Voivodeship, in eastern Poland.

Neighbouring gminas
Gmina Adamów is bordered by the gminas of Krasnobród, Krynice, Łabunie, Zamość and Zwierzyniec.

Villages
The gmina contains the following villages with the status of sołectwo: Adamów, Bliżów, Bondyrz, Boża Wola, Bródki, Czarnowoda, Feliksówka, Grabnik, Jacnia, Malinówka, Potoczek, Rachodoszcze, Suchowola, Suchowola-Kolonia, Szewnia Dolna, Szewnia Górna and Trzepieciny.

References

External links
Polish official population figures 2006

Adamow Z
Zamość County